Liviu Dorin Băjenaru (born 6 May 1983) is a Romanian professional footballer who plays as a midfielder for Liga III side CSM Focșani.

Career

FCSB
In June 2011, Băjenaru was traded to FCSB in exchange for Laurențiu Marinescu just a few days after Universitatea Cluj bought him from Gloria Bistrița.

In August 2011 was sold to Astra Ploiești, and one year after that he signed for Oțelul Galați.

Honours
Turris Turnu Măgurele
Liga III: 2018–19

CSA Steaua București
Liga III: 2020–21
Liga IV: 2019–20

References

External links

 
 

1983 births
Living people
Romanian footballers
Association football midfielders
Liga I players
Liga II players
Liga III players
FC Progresul București players
ACF Gloria Bistrița players
FC Universitatea Cluj players
FC Steaua București players
FC Astra Giurgiu players
CS Concordia Chiajna players
CS Gaz Metan Mediaș players
ASC Daco-Getica București players
AFC Turris-Oltul Turnu Măgurele players
CSA Steaua București footballers
CSM Focșani players